Joyful Noise is the third studio album by The Derek Trucks Band, released on September 2, 2002. It features an eclectic mix of music, ranging from gospel, blues, jazz fusion, Latin music, to East Indian music. Many of the songs feature special guests, including Trucks' wife Susan Tedeschi, Rahat Fateh Ali Khan, the nephew of Ustad Nusrat Fateh Ali Khan and a respected singer in his own right, and soul artist Solomon Burke. The album was produced by noted producers Russ Kunkel and Craig Street and was recorded at the Bearsville and Sunset Sound Studios. This is also the first album to feature the songwriting and musical talents of the band's newest member, Kofi Burbridge; keyboardist, flautist, and backing vocalist for the band, as well as brother to Oteil Burbridge, bassist in The Allman Brothers Band, with whom Derek Trucks is also a member.

Reception

In a review for AllMusic, Hal Horowitz called the album "a powerful, uncompromising statement," and wrote: "Prodding into Latin, Indian, and fusion jazz, this stylistically varied effort exudes enough blues and funky R&B to keep the Allman Brothers Band fan's attention while expanding their boundaries -- sometimes radically -- beyond what the typical Southern rock fan might expect or even tolerate."

Christian Hoard of Rolling Stone commented: "Boring-ass eclecticism is the hobgoblin of the jam-band nation, but here the kid tames a stylistic sprawl with nothing more than a bottleneck slide."

Writing for JazzTimes, Lucy Tauss called Trucks "prodigiously gifted," and described the album as "a gloriously eclectic excursion that ranges far beyond the Allmans' Southern jam-rock sound."

Author Dean Budnick praised Trucks' "emotive counterpoints" and the "ebullient support from his bandmates," and called the album "a stellar representation of the DTB's world-soul."

In an article for PopMatters, Adrien Begrand remarked: "Far from a self-indulgent, noodling showman who opts for bland style, Trucks goes for the more understated substance... The album is slick, but not overproduced in the least, the jamming never gets too self-indulgent, and Trucks' diverse choices in guest vocalists, and his band's undeniable talent, make Joyful Noise sparkle with life."

Exclaim!'''s Roman Sokal wrote: "Trucks... goes straight for the soul and spirit of music making... he overpowers without needing to be loud, and he allows all the musicians to be on top throughout; a magician, no less."

Reviewer George Graham stated that the album is "a first-rate recording from one of the bright young lights on the rock guitar scene," and commented: "In addition to being a fine player, Trucks' musical eclecticism is also impressive, incorporating everything from old-fashioned soul to unexpected world-music influences."

The Daily Vault's Jason Warburg remarked: "This is one of the most diverse albums I've heard in some time... These are four pure players who make a Joyful Noise'' indeed together, and this disc is a very worthy purchase for any fan of roots music or blues guitar who also has a sense of adventure."

Track listing

Personnel
The Derek Trucks Band
Derek Trucks - guitar
Yonrico Scott - drums, vocals, percussion
Kofi Burbridge, flute, vocals, keyboards
Todd Smallie - bass, vocals

Additional personnel
Susan Tedeschi - vocals (on track 8)
Rahat Fateh Ali Khan - vocals (on track 4)
Rubén Blades - vocals (on track 5)
Solomon Burke - vocals (on track 3)
Craig Street - producer
Russ Kunkel - producer
Greg Calbi - mastering
S. "Husky" Hoskulds - engineer, mixing
Damian Shannon - assistant engineer
Juan Bautista Sánchez García - assistant engineer
Nathan Burden - assistant engineer
Josh Cheuse - art direction, design
James Minchin - photography
Yves Beauvais - A&R

Charts

References

Derek Trucks albums
2002 albums
Albums produced by Craig Street
Albums produced by Russ Kunkel
Columbia Records albums